The Bone Mound II is a Native American mound in the southwestern part of the U.S. state of Ohio.  Located northwest of the unincorporated community of Oregonia, the mound sits in an area of light woodland.

Although it has never been excavated, multiple confirmed Fort Ancient sites, including mounds and two cemeteries, are located within  of the Bone Mound II.

The Fort Ancient people are known to have used burial vaults, pits, and two types of mounds for the burial of their dead.  However, most areas with such a high concentration of Fort Ancient sites employ only a single method of burial.  Because the area around the Bone Mound II shows evidence of multiple methods of burial, it may have been occupied by multiple foci of the Fort Ancient people; consequently, the region is very valuable archaeologically.

On July 15, 1974, the Bone Mound II was listed on the National Register of Historic Places because of its potential to be an archaeological site.  The Bone Stone Graves, the cemetery with limestone vaults, was listed on the Register on the same day.

References

Archaeological sites in Ohio
Fort Ancient culture
Archaeological sites on the National Register of Historic Places in Ohio
Geography of Warren County, Ohio
National Register of Historic Places in Warren County, Ohio
Mounds in Ohio